Henry Dudley Maxwell (1932 – 23 August 2013) was a New Zealand rugby league footballer who represented New Zealand in the 1957 and 1960 World Cups.

Biography
Maxwell played for the Point Chevalier Pirates in the Auckland Rugby League competition. He represented Auckland. He was selected to go on the 1955–56 New Zealand rugby tour of Great Britain and France. Maxwell played in a total of 20 tests for the Kiwis, including at the 1957 and 1960 World Cups. Henry played for the Rest of the World against Australia at the end of the World Cup.

He was made captain of the Auckland side in 1958. Maxwell played for Western United in the Auckland competition after Point Chevalier combined with Mount Albert.

Of Te Aupōuri descent, Maxwell captained the New Zealand Māori team on the 1956 tour of Australia.

He retired following the 1960 World Cup. He later moved to Batlow, New South Wales, Australia, where he coached the local rugby league team.

He died 23 August 2013 at Wagga Wagga at the age of 81.

References

1930s births
2013 deaths
Te Aupōuri people
New Zealand rugby league players
New Zealand national rugby league team players
New Zealand Māori rugby league players
New Zealand Māori rugby league team players
Auckland rugby league team players
Point Chevalier Pirates players
Rugby league props
New Zealand emigrants to Australia
Year of birth missing